Mencer is a surname of either German or English origin, being a variant of several other surnames. Notable people with the surname include:

Eli Mencer (born 1996), American professional football player
Glenn Everell Mencer (1925-2007), American judge

See also
Malcolm Mencer Martin (1920-2010), Austrian-British pediatric endocrinologist
Mentzer
Mainzer
Manser